John Edward "Jack" Gélineau BEM (November 11, 1924 in Toronto, Ontario – November 12, 1998) was a Canadian ice hockey goaltender. He played in the National Hockey League with the Boston Bruins and Chicago Black Hawks between 1948 and 1954. He won the Calder Memorial Trophy in 1950 as the best rookie player in the NHL. Prior to playing in the NHL, Gélineau served in the Second World War, and was awarded the British Empire Medal for actions in 1944.

Playing career
During the Second World War, Gélineau played for the Montreal and Toronto RCAF hockey team. He was awarded the British Empire Medal (BEM) for gallantry after surviving a 1944 plane crash and rescuing an injured crewman from the burning plane that was loaded with ammunition.

After the war, Gélineau played in net with the Montreal Jr. Royals in 1944–45.

In 1945–46, Gélineau entered McGill University and graduated with a Bachelor of Commerce in 1949.

He starred in goal at McGill for four seasons, racking up a 40–16–1 overall record with a 3.14 goals against average. He also played intermediate basketball, football and varsity baseball which resulted in a tryout with the Boston Red Sox. The last McGill goalie to be named team captain, Gélineau backstopped the Redmen to the 1946 Queen's Cup championship. He was the first recipient of the Forbes Trophy as McGill's male athlete of the year in 1948.

That spring, he was called up to the Boston Bruins in the National Hockey League, becoming the first goalie in 30 years to play in the NHL while still attending university (two decades later, Ken Dryden duplicated this feat while studying law at McGill and playing for the Montreal Canadiens). He won the Calder Memorial Trophy as the NHL's top rookie in 1949–50, but was unable to capitalize on his early potential. Despite his successful debut, he was unable to get a raise out of Bruins manager Art Ross. He took up a position with Sun Life Insurance in Montreal, though continued to play senior hockey over the next three season with the Quebec Aces in the Quebec Senior Hockey League, including two appearances with the Chicago Black Hawks in 1953–54. Gélineau retired in 1955.

Gélineau died on November 12, 1998, one day after his 74th birthday. He is buried at the National Field of Honour in Pointe-Claire, Quebec.

Career statistics

Regular season and playoffs

Awards and achievements
Queen's Cup champion in 1946.
McGill's Male Athlete of the Year in 1948.
Calder Memorial Trophy winner in 1950.

References

External links
 
 

1924 births
1998 deaths
Boston Bruins players
Calder Trophy winners
Canadian ice hockey goaltenders
Canadian recipients of the British Empire Medal
Chicago Blackhawks players
Franco-Ontarian people
Quebec Aces (QSHL) players
Ice hockey people from Toronto
Toronto Young Rangers players